Isoproscaline or 4-isopropoxy-3,5-dimethoxyphenethylamine is an analog of mescaline.  It is closely related to proscaline and was first synthesized by David E. Nichols.  It produces hallucinogenic, psychedelic, and entheogenic effects.

Chemistry
Isoproscaline is in a class of compounds commonly known as phenethylamines, and the full chemical name is 2-(4-isopropoxy-3,5-dimethoxyphenyl)ethanamine.

Effects
Little is known about the psychopharmacological effects of isoproscaline.  In his book PiHKAL, Alexander Shulgin lists a psychedelic dosage as being 40–80 mg, with effects lasting 10–16 hours.

Pharmacology
The mechanism that produces the hallucinogenic and entheogenic effects of isoproscaline is most likely to result from action as a 5-HT2A serotonin receptor agonist in the brain, a mechanism of action shared by all of the hallucinogenic tryptamines and phenethylamines.

Dangers
The toxicity of isoproscaline is not known.

Legality
Isoproscaline is unscheduled in the United States; however, because of its close similarity in structure and effects to mescaline, possession and sale of isoproscaline may be subject to prosecution under the Federal Analog Act.

In the UK, its highly likely that this compound would be covered by the "phenylethylamine amendment" to the misuse of drugs act likely rendering it a Class A controlled drug.

See also
Proscaline

References

Psychedelic phenethylamines
Designer drugs
Phenol ethers
Mescalines